George Gerald Beare (3 July 1905 – 28 September 1983) was an Australian rules footballer who played with Richmond and Melbourne in the Victorian Football League (VFL). Between his two VFL stints he played for South Ballarat, and after leaving Melbourne he played for Kyneton.

Beare was described as an "Old Xavier College boy" when he signed with Richmond from Rochester in 1924. 

Beare coached Sale Football Club in 1931. Beare then coached Kyneton CYMS in 1932, Griffith (NSW) in 1933, Sorrento in 1934, Kyneton in 1935, Fitzroy seconds in 1936, Yeronga (Brisbane) in 1937 and 1938, Old Xaverians (amateurs) in 1946 and Collegians (amateurs) in 1952.

Notes

External links 

Gerry Beare's profile at Demonwiki
Gerry Beare's profile at Tigerland Archives

1905 births
1983 deaths
Australian rules footballers from Victoria (Australia)
Richmond Football Club players
Melbourne Football Club players
Rochester Football Club players
South Ballarat Football Club players
Kyneton Football Club players